Zografou may refer to:

Zografou, an eastern suburb of Athens, Greece
Zograf Monastery, a Bulgarian Orthodox monastery on Mount Athos, Greece 
, a village in the municipal unit Moudania, Chalkidiki, Greece

See also 
 Zografos (disambiguation)
 Zograf (disambiguation)